Paul Galligan (20 June 1888 – 14 December 1966) was an Irish Sinn Féin politician who would experience over five years in prison as a result of his republican activities during the 1916 Rising in Enniscorthy and the War of Independence in County Cavan.

Peter Paul Galligan was born in Carrigallen, County Leitrim, Galligan attended school at St Patrick's College, Cavan. As a member of the Irish Republican Brotherhood and the Irish Volunteers, during the Easter Rising Galligan cycled from Dublin to Wexford carrying James Connolly's battle orders to ensure that the volunteers in the area rose to support those in Dublin. When the volunteers disbanded he cycled back to Cavan but was arrested at the family home.

He was elected unopposed as the Sinn Féin MP for Cavan West at the 1918 general election. The following month, in January 1919, Sinn Féin MPs who had been elected in the Westminster elections of 1918 refused to recognise the Parliament of the United Kingdom and instead assembled in the Mansion House in Dublin as a revolutionary parliament called Dáil Éireann, though Galligan did not attend as he was in prison. He was arrested again in September 1920  and re-elected as a Sinn Féin Teachta Dála (TD) for the Cavan constituency at the 1921 elections. He supported the Anglo-Irish Treaty and voted in favour of it. He did not contest the 1922 general election and retired from politics.

Sources
Robert Brennan (1950), Allegiance.

References

External links

1888 births
1966 deaths
Early Sinn Féin TDs
Members of the 1st Dáil
Members of the 2nd Dáil
Members of the Irish Republican Brotherhood
Members of the Parliament of the United Kingdom for County Cavan constituencies (1801–1922)
UK MPs 1918–1922
Politicians from County Wexford
People from County Leitrim